Theuns Fraser is a former South African international lawn bowler and current South African head coach and selector.

Bowls career
He won a bronze medal in the triples at the 1996 World Outdoor Bowls Championship in Adelaide.

He also won a bronze at the 1998 Commonwealth Games and a silver medal at the 2002 Manchester.

He won the 2016 fours at the National Championships bowling for 'The Nest' Bowls Club.

References

South African male bowls players
Living people
1951 births
Commonwealth Games medallists in lawn bowls
Commonwealth Games silver medallists for South Africa
Commonwealth Games bronze medallists for South Africa
Bowls players at the 1998 Commonwealth Games
Bowls players at the 2002 Commonwealth Games
Medallists at the 1998 Commonwealth Games
Medallists at the 2002 Commonwealth Games